Tselinny District (Ţelinn rayon) is an administrative and municipal district (raion), one of the thirteen in the Republic of Kalmykia, Russia.  Its administrative center is the rural locality (a selo) of Troitskoye. As of the 2010 census, the total population of the district was 20,051, with the population of Troitskoye accounting for 59.6%.

Geography
The district is located in the west of Kalmykia, in the area of the Yergeni hills.

History
The district was established in 1938.

Population

Ethnic composition (2010):
 Kalmyks – 59.2%
 Russians – 32.1%
 Dargins – 3.3%
 Chechens – 1.8%
 Others – 3.6%

Administrative and municipal status
Within the framework of administrative divisions, Tselinny District is one of the thirteen in the Republic of Kalmykia. The district is divided into eleven rural administrations which comprise twenty-five rural localities. As a municipal division, the district is incorporated as Tselinny Municipal District. Its eleven rural administrations are incorporated as eleven rural settlements within the municipal district. The selo of Troitskoye serves as the administrative center of both the administrative and municipal district.

References

Notes

Sources

Districts of Kalmykia
 
States and territories established in 1938